Mehta Publishing House is based in Pune, Maharashtra, specialising in Marathi language and literature publications. It was established in 1976 by Anil Mehta, with a focus on Marathi translations of books from English and other Indian languages.

References

External links

Publishing companies of India
Companies based in Pune
1976 establishments in Maharashtra
Publishing companies established in 1976